Transtillaspis chiribogana is a species of moth of the family Tortricidae. It is found in the Pichincha Province of Ecuador.

Its wingspan is about 20 mm. The ground colour of its forewings is brownish cream, suffused with brownish and spotted with brown. The hindwings are whitish cream, tinged with brownish posteriorly and with brownish strigulation (fine streaks).

Etymology
The species name refers to the type locality, Chiriboga.

References

Moths described in 2008
Transtillaspis
Taxa named by Józef Razowski